The 1963–64 West Midlands (Regional) League season was the 64th in the history of the West Midlands (Regional) League, an English association football competition for semi-professional and amateur teams based in the West Midlands county, Shropshire, Herefordshire, Worcestershire and southern Staffordshire.

Clubs
The league featured 18 clubs from the previous season, along with one new club:
Lower Gornal Athletic, joined from the Worcestershire Combination

League table

References

External links

1963–64
W